Pol Mahit (also Romanized as Pol Māhīt; also known as Mahakī Pol Māhīyat, Mahakī Pūl Māhī, Mahkī Pol Māhī, and Pūl Mahib) is a village in Beshiva Pataq Rural District, in the Central District of Sarpol-e Zahab County, Kermanshah Province, Iran. At the 2006 census, its population was 307, in 71 families.

References 

Populated places in Sarpol-e Zahab County